Hari Sabarno (August 12, 1944 – May 31, 2019) was an Indonesian army officer and former Minister of Home Affairs.

Early life and career 
On March 12, 2004, he was appointed by Megawati Soekarnoputri to be the interim Coordinating Minister for Political and Security Affairs replacing Susilo Bambang Yudhoyono who resigned from the post. Hari Sabarno also served as Minister of Home Affairs.

Corruption 
When he served as Minister of Home Affairs, there was a case of corruption in the procurement of Fire Trucks in 22 regions in Indonesia in 2002. This case dragged former Director General of Regional Autonomy Oentarto Sindung Mawardi and a number of regional heads to prison. Oentarto and a number of regional heads said Hari had to take responsibility for the corruption.

References 

1944 births
People from Central Java
2019 deaths
Indonesian politicians